Blang (Pulang) is the language of the Blang people of Burma and China.

Dialects 
Samtao of Burma is a dialect.

Blang dialects include the following:
Bulang 布朗; representative dialect: Xinman'e 新曼俄, Bulangshan District 布朗山区, Menghai County
A'erwa 阿尔佤 (Awa 阿佤); representative dialect: Guanshuang 关双, Mengman Township 勐满镇, Menghai County

Phonology 

Blang also has two tones - high and low.

See also 
Wa language

References

Sources

External links 
 Some links to Wa-related Internet sites
 http://projekt.ht.lu.se/rwaai RWAAI (Repository and Workspace for Austroasiatic Intangible Heritage)
 http://hdl.handle.net/10050/00-0000-0000-0003-9BBE-B@view Samtao in RWAAI Digital Archive
 Recordings of 'Pang' are available in the Xuan Guan Collection of Kaipuleohone archive

Palaungic languages
Languages of Myanmar
Languages of China